Harold Williams (17 June 1924 – 12 September 2014) was a Welsh international footballer who attained 4 caps for Wales. A nippy winger, he impressed the Leeds manager when he performed as part of the Newport County side that knocked Leeds out of the 1949 FA Cup. At the end of the season he became a Leeds player for what was quite a high fee at the time (£12,000). Able to switch wings at will, he was a creative and talented player who created many goals for John Charles as well as scoring a few himself. A broken leg in November 1952 kept him out of the side for 9 months, but he had lost nothing on his return. He left Leeds for a brief spell back at Newport making his total appearances 85 for Newport in the two spells, scoring 17 goals. He returned to Bradford Park Avenue where he lasted less than a season before retiring.

He became the landlord of The Griffin Hotel situated in the small quiet village of Gildersome near Morley after he retired from football, he ran the pub with his wife-and the pair earned much respect with their strictness.

At the time of his death in 2014, he was the oldest surviving Welsh international footballer.

References

1924 births
2014 deaths
Sportspeople from Briton Ferry
Welsh footballers
Wales international footballers
English Football League players
Newport County A.F.C. players
Leeds United F.C. players
Bradford (Park Avenue) A.F.C. players
Association football wingers